Spinal disease refers to a condition impairing the backbone. These include various diseases of the back or spine ("dorso-"), such as kyphosis. Dorsalgia refers to back pain. Some other spinal diseases include spinal muscular atrophy, ankylosing spondylitis, lumbar spinal stenosis, spina bifida, spinal tumors, osteoporosis and cauda equina syndrome.

Types
There are many recognized spinal diseases, some more common than others. Spinal disease also includes cervical spine diseases, which are diseases in the vertebrae of the neck. A lot of flexibility exists within the cervical spine and because of that, it is common for an individual to damage that area, especially over a long period of time. Some of the common cervical spine diseases include degenerative disc disease, cervical stenosis, and cervical disc herniation. Degenerative disc disease occurs over time when the discs within each vertebra in the neck begin to fall apart and begin to disintegrate. Because each vertebra can cause pain in different areas of the body, the pain from the disease can be sensed in the back, leg, neck area, or even the arms. When the spinal canal begins to lose its gap and gets thinner, it can cause pain in the neck, which can also cause a numb feeling in the arms and hands. Those are symptoms of  cervical stenosis disease. The discs between each vertebra have fibers that can begin to deteriorate, and this can occur in cervical disc herniation. This disease is less common in younger people as it is usually a function of aging.

Scoliosis
Scoliosis is a common spinal disease in which the spine has a curvature usually in the shape of the letter "C" or "S". This is most common in girls, but there is no specific cause for scoliosis. Only a few symptoms occur for one with this disease, which include feeling tired in the spinal region or backaches. Generally, if the hips or shoulders are uneven, or if the spine curves, it is due to scoliosis and should be seen by a doctor.

Lumbar spinal stenosis 
Lumbar spinal stenosis is classified as a narrowing of the spinal canal in the lumbar region of the vertebrae. This may lead to compression of the nerve root of the spinal cord and result in pain of the lower back and lower extremities. Other symptoms include impaired walking and a slightly stooped posture due to loss of disc height and bulging of the disc. Lumbar spinal stenosis is very prevalent with 9.3% of the general population producing symptoms and the number is continuing to rise in patients older than 60. It's generally an indication for spinal surgery in patients older than 65 years of age. However, there is a myth and fear among most patients that only surgery is the cure for such conditions and spine surgery is very risky. There are many non-surgical treatments available to prevent, halt and even reverse many spine diseases. Also, some surgery patients can be operated on in a daycare procedure or with minimum length of stay in hospital, with statistically good outcomes.

Spina bifida 
Spina bifida is the most common defect impacting the Central Nervous System (CNS). The most common and most severe form of Spina Bifida is Myelomeningocele. Individuals with Myelomeningocele are born with an incompletely fused spine, and therefore exposing the spinal cord through an opening in the back. In general, the higher the spinal lesion, the greater the functional impairment to the individual. Symptoms may include bowel and bladder problems, weakness and/or loss of sensation below the level of the lesion, paralysis, or orthopedic issues. Severity of symptoms can vary per situation.

Cauda equina syndrome 
Cauda equina syndrome is a rare syndrome that effects the spinal nerves in the region of the lower back called the cauda equine (Latin for "horses tail"). Injury to the cauda equine can have long lasting ramifications for the individual. Symptoms include lower back pain, bladder disturbances, bowel dysfunction, and anesthesia or paresthesia between the thighs. In order to prevent progressive neurological changes surgery can be a viable option.

Tumors
A spinal tumor is when unusual tissue begins growing and spreading in the spinal columns or spinal cords. The unusual tissue builds up from abnormal cells that multiply quickly in a specific region. Tumors generally are broken down into categories known as benign, meaning non-cancerous, or malignant, meaning cancerous, and also primary or secondary. Primary spinal tumors begin in either the spinal cord or spinal column, whereas secondary spinal tumors begin elsewhere and spread to the spinal region. Symptoms for spinal tumors may vary due to factors such as the type of tumor, the region of the spine, and the health of the patient. Back pain is the most common symptom and it can be a problem if the pain is severe, has a time frame that lasts longer than it would for a normal injury, and becomes worse while laying down or at rest. Other symptoms, excluding back pains, are loss of muscle function, loss of bowel or bladder function, pain in the legs, scoliosis, or even unusual sensations in the legs. The primary tumor has no known cause, although there are possible answers that scientists have researched. Cancer may be linked to genes because research shows that in certain families, the incidents of spinal tumors are higher. Two of the genetic disorders that may affect spinal tumors, include Von Hippel-Lindau disease and Neurofibromatosis 2. Von Hippel-Lindau disease is a non-cancerous tumor of blood vessels that occur in the brain, spinal cord, or even tumors in the kidneys. The Neuroflibromatosis 2 is a non-cancerous tumor that usually affects the nerves for hearing. Loss of hearing in one or both ears, is a common effect of this genetic disorder.

References

External links 

Vertebral column disorders